The Roccafortis or Roccaforte (Italian for "strong fortress") was a 13th-century warship built in Venice. A "round ship", it was considered one of the largest built in the 13th century, and saw service with the Republic of Venice and the Kingdom of France.

History 
Roccafortis was built in Venice (some sources say at the Venetian Arsenal) in the mid 13th-century. She was laid down as a round ship, and was often outfitted for war. The exact role of the ship is disputed; some sources note the ship was used to defend Venice's Levant trade, and she has been placed at the Battle of Saseno in 1264 between the Venetian and Genoese navies. At Saseno, Roccafortis size ensured that she was the only Venetian survivor of the battle, as the smaller Genoese ships were unable to capture the large vessel.

Other sources state the ship was constructed in 1268 at the behest of King Louis IX of France, who was amassing forces for the Eighth Crusade of 1270. In an essay on Venetian ships supplied to France during the Eighth Crusade, French naval historian Auguste Jal noted that Roccafortis was the largest of said ships. Jal also examined Latin documents detailing the design of the vessel.

Dimensions 
Roccafortis was remarkably large, though sources differ on its exact size.

References

Sources 
 
 
 
 
 
 

Ships built by the Venetian Arsenal
Ships of the Venetian navy
13th century in the Republic of Venice
Medieval ships